Charlie McConalogue (born 29 October 1977) is an Irish Fianna Fáil politician who has served as Minister for Agriculture, Food and the Marine since September 2020. He has been a Teachta Dála (TD) for the Donegal constituency since the 2016 general election, and previously from 2011 to 2016 for the Donegal North-East constituency. He previously served as Minister of State for Law Reform from July 2020 to September 2020.

Early life
McConalogue has a degree in economics, politics and history from University College Dublin (UCD), which he completed after a year as Education Officer in the UCD Students' Union. After graduation, he worked as a political organiser at the Fianna Fáil HQ in Dublin. Upon the death of his father, he returned home to manage the family farm near Carndonagh in the north of Inishowen, County Donegal.

He was raised near Gleneely, a village in the north of Inishowen, and was in Australia before returning to the farm. He is married with two sons.

Political career
McConalogue was elected to Donegal County Council at the 2009 local elections to represent the Inishowen local electoral area.

After Jim McDaid's retirement and Niall Blaney's decision to step down from politics for personal reasons, Fianna Fáil had no sitting TD in Donegal North-East to contest the 2011 general election. The party chose McConalogue as Fianna Fáil's sole candidate for the constituency.

In the election, he won 17.4% of the first-preference vote and was elected on the 9th count to fill the third and final seat, behind Sinn Féin's Pádraig Mac Lochlainn and Fine Gael's Joe McHugh. He was the Fianna Fáil spokesperson on Children from April 2011 to July 2012. In July 2012, he was appointed as party spokesperson on Education and Skills.

In the 2016 general election, after a redrawing of constituency boundaries, McConalogue ran alongside Pat "the Cope" Gallagher as one of two Fianna Fáil candidates in the new five-seater Donegal constituency. McConalogue topped the poll and was elected on the first count.

He represented Fianna Fáil in talks on government formation in 2016.

On 1 July 2020, McConalogue was appointed as a Minister of State at the Department of Justice with responsibility for law reform. On 2 September that year, he was appointed as Minister for Agriculture, Food and the Marine, with the vacancy having arisen following the Oireachtas Golf Society scandal.

On 23 December, all ministers in the Government restricted their movements after it emerged that McConalogue had tested positive for COVID-19 after returning from Brussels on 17 December. The initial result was negative. McConalogue went shopping in Dublin city centre hours ahead of a scheduled five-day follow-up COVID-19 test which led to the positive result he received "sometime between 10.30am and 11am" on 23 December. He displayed no symptoms and isolated in his native Donegal. McConalogue had been due to travel to Canada for St Patrick's Day in March 2022. However, he later confirmed that a positive COVID-19 test had prevented him from doing so. His period of isolation elapsed in time for him to sit on the "VIP lorry" at the parade in Buncrana.

On 17 December 2022, he was re-appointed to the same position following Leo Varadkar's appointment as Taoiseach.

References

External links
Charlie McConalogue's page on the Fianna Fáil website

 

1977 births
Living people
Alumni of University College Dublin
Fianna Fáil TDs
Irish farmers
Local councillors in County Donegal
Members of the 31st Dáil
Members of the 32nd Dáil
Members of the 33rd Dáil
Politicians from County Donegal
Ministers of State of the 33rd Dáil
Ministers for Agriculture (Ireland)